South Eastern Kenya University "SEKU" is a public university with its main campus located in Kwa Vonza, Kitui County, Kenya.

It was formerly South Eastern University College "SEUCO", a constituent college of The University of Nairobi prior to its award of Charter in 2013.

The Vice Chancellor of SEKU is Prof. Geofrey M. Muluvi.

Location
It is specifically located near Kwa Vonza along the Machakos-Kitui Highway and close to the Kitui Campus of Kenyatta University. The gate is about 7 km from the Kwa Vonza junction, but most structures in the university are about 17 km from the junction.

Undergraduate Courses 
 Bachelor of Arts
 Bachelor of Arts (Social Work)
 Bachelor of Arts (Gender & Development Studies)
 Bachelor of Education (Arts)
 Bachelor of Education (Science)
 Bachelor of Education (Early Childhood)
 Bachelor of Science (Agriculture)
 Bachelor of Science (Dryland Agriculture)
 Bachelor of Science (Horticulture)
 Bachelor of Science (Range Management)
 Bachelor of Science (Dryland Animal Science)
 Bachelor of Science (Foods Nutrition and Dietetics)
 Bachelor of Science (Agribusiness Management & Entrepreneurship)
 Bachelor of Science (Agricultural Education & Extension)
 Bachelor of Science (Hydrology and Water Resources Management)
 Bachelor of Science (Fisheries Management and Aquatic Technology)
 Bachelor of Science (Applied Aquaculture Sciences)
 Bachelor of Science (Mathematics)
 Bachelor of Science (Actuarial Science)
 Bachelor of Science (Statistics)
 Bachelor of Science (Biology )
 Bachelor of Science (Molecular Biology & Biochemistry)
 Bachelor of Science (Chemistry)
 Bachelor of Science (Physics)
 Bachelor of Science (Electronics)
 Bachelor of Science (Forestry)
 Bachelor of Science (Environmental Conservation & Natural Resources Management)
 Bachelor of Science (Land Resources Management)
 Bachelor of Science (Environmental Management)
 Bachelor of Science ( Agro-ecosystems and Environmental Management)
 Bachelor of Science (Public Health)
 Bachelor of Science (Nursing)
 Bachelor of Science (Population Health)
 Bachelor of Science (Meteorology)
 Bachelor of Science (Geology)
 Bachelor of Science (Computer Science)
 Bachelor of Information Technology
 Bachelor of Commerce
 Bachelor of Procurement and Supply Chain Management
 Bachelor of Economics and Statistics
 Bachelor of Economics
 Bachelor of Project Planning & Management
 Bachelor of Business & Information Technology
 Bachelor of Science in Medical Microbiology.
 Bachelor of Science in Aquatic Sciences

Masters Programmes 
 Master of Business Administration
 Master of Science (Agro meteorology)
 Master of Science (Mineral Exploration and Mining)
 Master of Science (Exploration Geo-Physics)
 Master of Education
 Master of Education ( Kiswahili Methods)
 Master of Education (Early Childhood Education)
 Master of Science (Environmental Management)
 Master of Science (Climate Change & Agroforestry)
 Master of Science (Agricultural Resource Management)
 Master of Science (Livestock Production Systems)
 Master of Science (Agronomy)
 Master of Science (Mammalian Physiology)
 Master of Science (Reproductive Biology)
 Master of Science (Rangeland Resources Management)
 Master of Science (Public Health)
 Master of Science (Epidemiology)
 Master of Science (International Health)
 Master of Science (Infectious Disease Diagnosis)
 Master of Science( Biotechnology)
 Master of Science (Biochemistry)
 Master of Science (Physics)
 Master of Science (Integrated Water Resources Management)
 Master of Science (Biodiversity Conservation and Management)

PHD Programmes 
 Doctor of Philosophy (Dryland Resource Management)
 Doctor of Philosophy (Agricultural Economics)
 Doctor of Philosophy (Environmental Management)
 Doctor of Philosophy (Climate Change & Agroforestry)
 Doctor of Philosophy (Educational Administration and Planning)
 Doctor of Philosophy (Physics)
 Doctor of Philosophy (Animal Science)

Certificate And Diploma Programmes 
 Short Course in Computer Applications
 Certificate in Animal Health Husbandry
 Certificate in Artificial Insemination and Fertility Management
 Certificate in Information Technology
 Certificate in Computer Packages & Applications
 Certificate in Environmental Impact Assessment(EIA) and Audit
 Diploma in Sales and Marketing
 Diploma in Human Resource Management
 Diploma in Purchasing and Supplies Management
 Diploma in Business Management
 Diploma in Forestry
 Diploma in Information Technology
 Diploma in Computer Science
 Diploma in Range land Management
 Diploma in Apiculture
 Diploma in Animal Health
 Diploma in Crop Protection
 Diploma in Electronics

Schools 
 School of Environment, Water and Natural Resources
 School of Education
 School of Humanities and Social Sciences
 School of Pure and Applied Sciences
 School of Business and Economics
 School of Environment & Natural Resources Management
 School of Engineering and Technology
 School of Agriculture and Veterinary Sciences
School of Nursing Sciences and Public Health

Research 
The University is said to be taking a leading role in the making of water purification devices. SEKU has distributed low-cost ceramic water filters to more than 1,000 residents of Kitui and its environs. The move is aimed at improving the socio-economic parameters and health of the locals by having them access clean water. This is because most of this region is semi-arid.

Campuses
SEKU Main Campus (Kwa Vonza)
Machakos Town Campus
Wote Town Campus
Mtito-Andei Town Campus
Kitui Town campus

References

Educational institutions established in 1976
Universities in Kenya
1976 establishments in Kenya